Breda Pergar (22 February 1953 – 27 April 1989) was a middle distance and long distance runner from Yugoslavia. A one-time Olympian (1980) she is best known for winning the gold medal at the 1981 Summer Universiade in Bucharest in the women's 3,000 metres event, clocking 8:53.78 on 26 July 1981.

References
trackfield.brinkster

1953 births
1989 deaths
Yugoslav female middle-distance runners
Yugoslav female long-distance runners
Olympic athletes of Yugoslavia
Athletes (track and field) at the 1980 Summer Olympics
World Athletics Championships athletes for Yugoslavia
Universiade medalists in athletics (track and field)
Universiade gold medalists for Yugoslavia
Medalists at the 1981 Summer Universiade